Uivar is a commune in Timiș County, Romania. It is composed of four villages: Pustiniș, Răuți, Sânmartinu Maghiar and Uivar (commune seat). Two other villages, Otelec and Iohanisfeld, which had been part of Uivar commune since 1968, were split off in 2008 to form Otelec commune.

Name

History 
Remains of Neolithic, Daco-Roman and medieval settlements were discovered on the territory of the commune. Archaeological excavations here revealed a Neolithic settlement from the 5th millennium BC that belongs to the Vinča culture.

The first recorded mention of Uivar dates from 1811, when 50 German families were colonized here. Each family then received 32 jugers of arable land. In 1851 a new wave of colonization took place, this time with Hungarians from the Szeged area and Germans. The village then became German-Hungarian, but over time the Hungarian element dissipated, leaving an overwhelming majority of Germans. After World War II, their number began to decline sharply and they were gradually replaced by Romanians. Today the village is mostly Romanian.

Demographics 

Uivar had a population of 2,453 inhabitants at the 2011 census, down 10% from the 2002 census. Most inhabitants are Romanians (73.79%), larger minorities being represented by Hungarians (16.06%) and Roma (4.65%). For 4.4% of the population, ethnicity is unknown. By religion, most inhabitants are Orthodox (56.34%), but there are also minorities of Roman Catholics (20.67%), Greek Catholics (12.19%) and Pentecostals (4.53%). For 4.4% of the population, religious affiliation is unknown.

Notes

References 

Communes in Timiș County
Localities in Romanian Banat